Lovepreet Singh (born 6 September 1997) is an Indian weightlifter who competes in the men's 109 kg weight category. He won the silver medal at the 2021 Commonwealth Weightlifting Championships and bronze medal at the 2022 Commonwealth Games. In 2017, he won bronze at the Asian Youth Championships and gold at the Junior Commonwealth Championships in the 105 kg category. He works for the Indian Navy.

References

External links

Living people
1997 births
Indian male weightlifters
Weightlifters from Punjab, India
Sportspeople from Amritsar
Weightlifters at the 2022 Commonwealth Games
Commonwealth Games bronze medallists for India
Commonwealth Games medallists in weightlifting
21st-century Indian people
Medallists at the 2022 Commonwealth Games